Aleksandr Ivanovich Kupriyanov (born July 23, 1952) is a former Soviet footballer.

Career
Aleksandr Kupriyanov spent his  career at Krylia Sovetov Kuybyshev, he made 328 league appearances for the club and scored 59 goals. He started his career as a striker, but later also played as defender and midfielder.

Kupriyanov also played for RSFSR team at the 1979 Summer Spartakiad of the Peoples of the USSR.

Honours
Soviet First League winner: 1975, 1978.

League appearances and goals by season

See also
List of one-club men

External links
 Profile on FC Krylia Sovetov Samara official web-site
 Career summary at KLISF

1952 births
Living people
Soviet footballers
Soviet Top League players
Soviet First League players
PFC Krylia Sovetov Samara players

Association football forwards